A blowtorch, also referred to as a blowlamp, is an ambient air fuel-burning gas lamp used for applying flame and heat to various applications, usually metalworking.

Description
Early blowtorches used liquid fuel, carried in a refillable reservoir attached to the lamp. This is distinct from modern gas-fueled torches burning fuel such as a butane torch or a propane torch. Their fuel reservoir is disposable or refillable by exchange. Liquid-fueled torches are pressurized by a piston hand pump, while gas torches are self-pressurized by the fuel evaporation. The term "blowtorch" is commonly misused as a name for any metalworking torch, but properly describes the pressurized liquid fuel torches that predate the common use of pressurized fuel gas cylinders.

Torches are available in a vast range of size and output power. The term "blowtorch" applies to the obsolescent style of smaller liquid fuel torches. Blowtorches are typically a single hand-held unit, with their draught supplied by a natural draught of air and the liquid fuel pressurized initially by hand plunger pump, then by regenerative heating once the torch is in operating state. The larger torches may have a heavy fuel reservoir placed on the ground, connected by a hose. This is common for butane- or propane-fuelled gas torches, but also applies to the older, large liquid paraffin (kerosene) torches such as the Wells light.

Many torches now use a hose-supplied gas feed, which is often mains gas. They may also have a forced-air supply, from either an air blower or an oxygen cylinder. Both of these larger and more powerful designs are less commonly described as blowtorches, while the term blowtorch is usually reserved for the smaller and less powerful self-contained torches. The archaic term "blowpipe" is sometimes still used in relation to oxy-acetylene welding torches.

History
The blowtorch is of ancient origin and was used as a tool by goldsmiths and silversmiths. They began literally as a "blown lamp", a wick oil lamp with a mouth-blown tube alongside the flame. This type of lamp, with spirit fuel, continued to be in use for such small tasks into the late 20th century.

In 1797 or 1799, German inventor August von Marquardt invented a blowtorch in Eberswalde.

Another early blow pipe patent comes from the US, dated May 13, 1856.

In 1882, a new vaporizing technique was developed by Carl Richard Nyberg in Sweden, and the year after, the production of the Nyberg blowtorch started. It was quickly copied or licensed by many other manufacturers.

The US version of the blowtorch was independently developed with a distinctive flared base and was fueled by gasoline, whereas the European versions used kerosene for safety and low cost.

After the Korean War in the 1950s, wider availability of propane caused many changes in the blowtorch industry worldwide, and by the 1970s most manufacturers of the old type of blowtorch, using gasoline or kerosene as fuel, had disappeared.  There remain several manufacturers producing brass blowtorches in India, China and North Korea for markets where propane gas is difficult to obtain or too expensive to be viable.

Applications
The blowtorch is commonly used where a diffuse (wide spread) high temperature naked flame heat is required but not so hot as to cause combustion or welding. Temperature applications are soldering, brazing, softening paint for removal, melting roof tar, or pre-heating large castings before welding such as for repairing. It is also common for use in weed control by controlled burn methods, and for melting snow and ice from pavements and driveways in cold climate areas. Especially the US and Canada, road repair crews may use a blowtorch to heat asphalt or bitumen for repairing cracks in preventive maintenance. It is also used in cooking; one common use is for the creation of the layer of hard caramelized sugar in a crème brûlée.

Types and variants
The blowtorch is referred to in industry and trade according to the fuel consumed by the tool:
Gas:
 propane gas, see propane torch
 MAPP gas
 butane gas, see butane torch
 liquefied petroleum gas (LPG) with ambient atmospheric air via a replaceable LPG cylinder.
 oxy-fuel torch
Liquid, with ambient atmospheric air after vaporizing it using a coiled tube passing through the flame. They take time to start, needing pre-heating with burning methylated spirit:
 kerosene as described in C.R. Nyberg patent of 1882: a simple heating torch using liquid fuel (such as kerosene (US) / paraffin oil (UK).
 diesel
 biodiesel
In the case of the gas torch, the fuel tank often is small and serves also as the handle, and usually is refueled by changing the fuel tank with the liquefied gas in it.

The forms with gaseous fuel are sometimes fed from a liquid petroleum gas cylinder via a hose.

Variant 
A flame gun is a large type of blowlamp with built-in fuel tank, used for various purposes: weed control by controlled burn methods, melting snow and ice off walk and driveways in the winter, starting a fire, etc. It is commonly confused in word usage with a flamethrower.

Media

See also 
 Butane torch
 Gas burner
 Oxy-fuel welding and cutting
 Plasma torch
 Propane torch

References

External links 

 Website with information about gasoline blowtorches
 Popular Mechanics October 1, 1926, pp 685. "Blowtorch Made from Gasoline Lamp" by LB Robbins
 Pressure Lamps International
 Blow Lamps Unlimited
 Southern Steam Trains

Gardening tools
Burners
Tools